Mithila Deep railway station is a  Broade-gauge railway station in Madhubani district, Bihar. Its code is MTLP. The station consists of 2 platforms. The station lies on Sakri–Nirmali Broade-gauge line.

Major trains

 (05548) Saharsha - Laheriyasarai DMU
 (05547) Laheriyasarai - Saharsha DMU
 (05544) Saharsha - Laheriyasarai DMU
 (05543) Laheriyasarai - Saharsha DMU
 (05546) Saharsha - Laheriyasarai DMU
 (05547) Laheriyasarai - Saharsha DMU

References

Railway stations in Madhubani district
Samastipur railway division